The 1991 Brisbane Broncos season was the fourth in the club's history. They competed in the NSWRL's 1991 Winfield Cup premiership and failed to reach the finals, finishing 7th (out of 16).

Three Broncos players, Paul Hauff, Willie Carne and Andrew Gee were selected to make their international debuts for Australia in 1991.

Season summary 
In the 1991 NSWRL season the Broncos again won the Panasonic Cup competition. In round 16 they were kept scoreless by the Manly-Warringah Sea Eagles, the first team ever to do so. Steve Renouf became the first Bronco to score four tries in a match in round 20. However they didn't perform consistently enough during the season, only gaining momentum in August, when they won their last five matches straight. The club finished the season in seventh place, missing the finals despite winning their last 5 games consecutively and finishing with the second best points scored total in the League.

Match results 

 *Game following a State of Origin match

Ladder

Scorers

Honours

League 
 Nil

Club 
 Player of the year: Trevor Gillmeister
 Rookie of the year: Julian O'Neill
 Back of the year: Allan Langer
 Forward of the year: Andrew Gee
 Club man of the year: Andrew Gee

References 

Brisbane Broncos seasons
Brisbane Broncos season
Brisbane Broncos season